The  is an archaeological site containing a group of  tombs located in the Tokumasu neighborhood of the town of Nagara in Chiba Prefecture in the Kantō region of Japan. The these tombs have been protected as a National Historic Site since 1995.

Overview
Corridor-type kofun appeared in the Bōsō region from the latter half of the 6th century AD and about 4000 examples have been found in Chiba Prefecture. The group at Nagara was made in the mid-7th and early 8th century AD, and consists of 324 tombs in 25 groups, distributed in the southern part of Nagara town. The style in this region is unique and is called the "Kodanshiki," in which the burial chamber is a smaller room located at the rear of an entrance room and elevated slightly above it. The largest tomb has difference in height between these rooms of 2.9 meters. The entrance rooms can roughly be divided into what is called an "arch type", in which the cross section of the ceiling shows a semi-cylindrical shape, and what is called a "house type" in which the ceiling and walls mimic the roof and walls of a house. In addition, there are a few which are "dome type" with a domed ceiling. Some of the tombs have a casket platform, on which the wooden sarcophagus once rested.

One of the tombs, designated No.13, has a line engraving on its back wall depicting people, birds, houses, boats, and what appears to be a five-story Japanese pagoda.

The tombs have been opened since antiquity, and few grave goods have been recovered, other than fragments of Sue ware and Haji ware pottery and fragments of iron tools or weapons.

The site is a 15-minute walk from the Tokumasu bus stop on the Kominato Bus from Mobara Station on the JR East Sotobo Line.

See also

List of Historic Sites of Japan (Chiba)

References

External links

Chiba Prefecture home page 
Nagara Town Home Page 

Kofun
Nagara, Chiba
Historic Sites of Japan
Archaeological sites in Japan
History of Chiba Prefecture